Jean-Yves Tadié (born 7 September 1936) is a French writer, biographer, and academic, noted particularly for his work on Marcel Proust.

Biography
Tadié studied at the École normale supérieure in Paris, graduating in 1956.  He began to publish his studies on Proust in 1959.  He edited the 1987-1989 four-volume Pléiade edition of In Search of Lost Time, which includes sketches and variants.  He published his biography of Proust in 1996 (English translation published in 2000).

Tadié was a professor at the Paris-Sorbonne University (Paris IV) and director of the collections "Classical Folio" and "Theatre Folio".  He is now professor emeritus at Paris-Sorbonne University.

Tadié has served as director of the "Folio Classique" and "Folio Théâtre" collections at Gallimard.  For Gallimard and the Bibliothèque de la Pléiade edition, Tadié also worked on literature by Nathalie Sarraute and André Malraux.

Outside of France, Tadié was a director of the French Institute in London, a fellow at All Souls' College, Oxford (1988-1991) and faculty member of the Faculty of Medieval and Modern Languages at Oxford, as well as universities in Yaoundé, Alexandria, and Cairo.  He has been a Commander in the Order of Arts and Letters since 2011 and Vice-President of the Société des Amis de Marcel Proust.

Tadié and his wife Arlette Khoury-Tadié have three children, Alexis, Benoît and Jérôme.

Selected bibliography
 Introduction à la vie littéraire du XIXe siècle, Bordas, 1971.
 Lectures de Proust, Colin, 1971.
 Proust et le Roman, Gallimard, 1971.
 Le Récit poétique, PUF, 1978 ; Gallimard, 1994.
 Le Roman d’aventures, PUF, 1982.
 Proust, Belfond, 1983.
 La Critique littéraire au XXe siècle, Belfond, 1987.
 Études proustiennes I à VI, Gallimard, 1973-1988.
 Le Roman au XXe siècle, Belfond, 1990.
 Portrait de l’artiste, Oxford University Press, 1991.
 Marcel Proust, biographie, Gallimard, 1996. (English translation )
 Le Sens de la mémoire (avec Marc Tadié), Gallimard, 1999.
 Proust, la cathédrale du temps, Gallimard, coll. "Découvertes Gallimard" vol. 381, 1999.
 Regarde de tous tes yeux, regarde ! Gallimard, 2005.
 De Proust à Dumas, Gallimard, 2006.
 Le lac inconnu, entre Proust et Freud, Gallimard, 2012.
 Marcel Proust: Croquis d'une épopée, Gallimard, 2019.

References

External links

 The André Malraux Foundation

1936 births
Academic staff of the University of Paris
École Normale Supérieure alumni
French scholars
French non-fiction writers
Living people
Fellows of All Souls College, Oxford
Marshal Foch Professors of French Literature
French male non-fiction writers
Scholars of French literature
Corresponding Fellows of the British Academy